After You'd Gone is Northern Irish author Maggie O'Farrell's debut novel. Published in 2000 by Headline Review, it garnered 'international acclaim' and won a Betty Trask Award.

O'Farrell started writing the story which was to become After You'd Gone Home at an Arvon Foundation course in Yorkshire. It was praised by her tutors, Barbara Trapido and Elspeth Barker.

Plot introduction
The novel centres on Alice who is in a coma following a suicide attempt. Using shifting times and viewpoints it tells of the lives and loves of three generations of women: Alice and her two sisters Kirsty and Beth, her complex and secretive mother Ann, and her grandmother Elspeth in whose North Berwick home they all lived. Central to the story is the passionate relationship of Alice with her Jewish partner John, who works in Canary Wharf and is caught up in the 1996 Docklands bombing.

Reception
According to Jane Rogers in the second edition of OUP's Good Fiction Guide, the novel was released to 'raptuous reviews'.  Rogers herself praises the 'crystal-clear prose' and goes on to say "This is  a love story and a family saga, but the skill with which it is constructed and written gives startling life to these traditional subjects: feelings of love and grief are rarely so well explored

Elizabeth Speller writing in The Guardian is also impressed with the strength of the writing, "what makes this book remarkable is a luminous use of language and imagery which turn Alice's world into one of elements and of sensation; a universe of light, smell, taste, heat and sound." 

Kirkus Reviews concludes "O’Farrell is an astute observer of little behaviors, the telling fidgets and habits of everyday existence, and she's at her best when piecing these together to create a sense of a real life experienced through fiction. The complex structure works beautifully, communicating the shared and interlocking sufferings of the Raikes women through its carefully worked-out layering of narrative lines.  Often painful to read, but finally quite satisfying.

References

External links 
 
Chapter One online
New York Times Review

2000 novels
Novels set in Scotland
Novels set in London
Novels about suicide
Fiction set in 1996
North Berwick
2000 debut novels
Headline Publishing Group books